Ahmed Saïd (born 1 January 1953) is an Algerian boxer. He competed in the men's light flyweight event at the 1980 Summer Olympics.

References

External links
 

1953 births
Living people
Algerian male boxers
Olympic boxers of Algeria
Boxers at the 1980 Summer Olympics
Competitors at the 1975 Mediterranean Games
Mediterranean Games bronze medalists for Algeria
Place of birth missing (living people)
Mediterranean Games medalists in boxing
Light-flyweight boxers
21st-century Algerian people
20th-century Algerian people